Robert Welch University (RWU) was an online university based in Appleton, Wisconsin. It was approved to grant the Associate's Degree in Liberal Arts  and offered a program in U.S. History, American Studies, Latin, Ancient Greek, Biblical Hebrew, Modern Hebrew and Arabic.

On June 15, 2007, Robert Welch University had its first graduating class. Lisa St. Louis, the Dean, presented associate degrees and an award for excellence in Latin.

It participated in the activities of the American Classical League, Atlantic Classical Association, Classical Association of Canada, Ontario Classical Association and Ontario Student Classics Conference.

As of 2010, the Wisconsin Educational Advisory Board describes the company as "inactive".

References

External links
RWU's Official Webpage

Defunct universities and colleges in Wisconsin
Educational institutions established in 2007
Appleton, Wisconsin
2007 establishments in Wisconsin
John Birch Society